Estadio Olímpico (Spanish) or Estádio Olímpico (Portuguese) ("Olympic Stadium") may refer to:

Estadio Olímpico (Caracas), in Caracas, Venezuela
Estadio Olímpico (Montevideo), in Montevideo, Uruguay
Estadio Olímpico Atahualpa, in Quito, Ecuador 
Estadio Olímpico Benito Juárez, in Ciudad Juárez, Mexico
Estadio Mario Alberto Kempes aka Estadio Olímpico Chateau Carreras, in Córdoba, Argentina
Estádio Olímpico Colosso da Lagoa, in Erechim, Brazil
Estadio Olímpico de Riobamba, in Riobamba, Ecuador
Estadio Olímpico de San Marcos, in San Marcos, Nicaragua
Estadio de La Cartuja aka Estadio Olímpico, in Seville, Spain
Estadio Olímpico Hermanos Ghersi Páez, in Maracay, Venezuela
Estádio Olímpico João Havelange, in Rio de Janeiro, Brazil
Estadio Olímpico Félix Sánchez, formerly Estadio Olímpico Juan Pablo Duarte, in Santo Domingo, Dominican Republic
Estadio José Antonio Anzoátegui, formerly Estadio Olímpico Luis Ramos, in Puerto la Cruz, Venezuela
Estadio Olímpico (La Vega), in Concepción de la Vega, Dominican Republic
Estadio Olímpico Metropolitano, in San Pedro Sula, Honduras
Estádio Olímpico Monumental, in Porto Alegre, Brazil
Estadio Manuel Rivera Sanchez aka Estadio Olímpico Municipal, in Chimbote, Peru
Estadio Olímpico Pascual Guerrero, in Cali, Colombia
Estadio Olímpico Patria, in Sucre, Bolivia
Estádio Olímpico Regional Arnaldo Busatto, in Cascavel, Brazil
Estadio Olímpico Universitario, in Mexico City